Charlaine "Charlayne" Woodard (born December 29, 1953) is an American playwright and actress. She is a two-time Obie Award winner as well as a Tony Award and Drama Desk nominee. She was a series regular on the hit FX TV series Pose. She played the title role in the Showtime movie Run For The Dream: The Gail Devers’ Story. Starring as Cindy in the ABC Movie of the Week, Woodard was the first black Cinderella portrayed on TV or film. Currently, she is in Marvel Studios' upcoming limited TV series Secret Invasion, which is scheduled to premiere in early 2023.

Career
Woodard began her professional career in 1976 performing in the road company of Don't Bother Me I Can't Cope, written by Mickey Grant and directed by Vinette Carroll, the first black female director on Broadway. In 1977, she made her Broadway debut in the revival of Hair, directed by Tom O’Horgan; played a supporting role in the movie version of Hair, directed by Milos Forman; starred as Cindy in the NBC Movie of the Week, Cindy; and performed on The Johnny Carson Show. 

In 1978, she was in the original company of the hit musical [[Ain't Misbehavin' (musical)|Ain't Misbehavin''']], for which she was nominated for both a Tony Award and Drama Desk Award for Best Featured Actress in a Musical. She reprised her role at Her Majesty's Theater in London's West End; the Aquarius theater in Los Angeles; and ten years after the Broadway opening, the Broadway revival with the original cast. NBC taped and broadcast the hit musical with the original Broadway cast. RCA released the original cast album.

Charlayne Woodard has written and performed five solo plays: Neat, Pretty Fire, In Real Life, The Night Watcher and Flight. The Garden, a two-hander commissioned by the La Jolla Playhouse, was produced at both Baltimore Center Stage and The LaJolla Playhouse. Woodard's plays are published by Dramatists Play Service.

As an actress, Woodard's off-Broadway theatre credits include Daddy (2019) by Jeremy O. Harris, directed by Danya Taymor Signature Theater; played Gertrude to Oscar Issac's Hamlet, directed by Sam Gold, at the Public Theater; War (2016)  by Brandon-Jacobs Jenkins, directed by Liliana Blain-Cruz at Lincoln Center; the 2014 revival of The Substance of Fire by John Robin Baitz, directed by Trip Cullman at Second Stage; The Witch of Edmonton (2010) directed by Jessie Berger, for which she was awarded her second Obie Award, at The Red Bull Theatre Company; world premiere of in the Blood (1999) by Suzan-Lori Parks directed by David Esbjornson for which she was awarded her first Obie Award; Fabulation (2004) by Lynn Nottage, directed by Kate Whorisky at Playwright's Horizons; Stunning (2009) by David Adjmi, directed By Anne Kauffman at LCT3; Sorrows and Rejoicings, written and directed by Athol Fugard at Second Stage for which she received an Audelco Award; The Caucasian Chalk Circle (1990), directed by George C. Wolfe at the Public Theatre; Twelfth Night (1989) alongside Michelle Pfeiffer, Gregory Hines, Jeff Goldblum, and Mary Elizabeth Mastrantonio at Shakespeare in the Park; Paradise (1985) a musical with lyrics by George C. Wolfe, music by Robert Forest, directed by Ted Pappas at Playwrights Horizons.  Woodard's regional credits include: Midsummer Night's Dream, directed by Chris Ashley, as well as Shout Up A Morning, directed by Des McAnuff, both at the La Jolla Playhouse; The Taming of the Shrew (Kate), directed by Rebecca Taishman at Shakespeare Theatre Company; The Good Person of Szechwan, adapted by Tony Kushner, directed by Lisa Peterson at the LaJolla Playhouse; and Purgatorio by Ariel Dorfman, directed by David Esbjornson at Seattle Rep.

Notable film roles include Hard Feelings (1982) for which she received a Canadian Genie Award for Best Performance by a Foreign Actress nomination; Crackers (1984) alongside Sean Penn, Donald Sutherland and Jack Warner, directed by Louis Malle; Twister (1989), alongside Tim Robbins, Dylan McDermott and Harry Dean Stanton, directed by Michael Almereyda; One Good Cop (1991) alongside Michael Keaton (1991); An Eye for an Eye (1995) opposite Sally Field and Kiefer Sutherland; Tituba in the 1996 drama film The Crucible, alongside Daniel Day-Lewis and Winona Ryder, directed by Nicolas Hytner; Touched By Evil (1997) alongside Paula Abdul; Around The Fire (1998) directed by John Jacobson; John Sayle’s Sunshine State (2002) alongside Angela Bassett; M. Night Shyamalan’s Unbreakable (2000) and its sequel Glass (2019) alongside Samuel L. Jackson; The Million Dollar Hotel (2000) alongside Mel Gibson, directed by Wim Wenders; Things Never Said (2013) written and directed by Charles Murray.

Among Woodard's many TV roles are Pricilla in Marvel Studios' limited series, Secret Invasion (2023); season regular on Pose (2018); recurring roles on In Treatment Season 4; Animal Kingdom (2021); Prodigal Son 2019 – 2020); Sneaky Pete (2019); Terminator: The Sarah Connor Chronicles (2008); Sweet Justice (1994); Sister Peg on Law and Order: Special Victims Unit (2002 to 2011), ER  (2006–2007); and Chicago Hope'' (1994–2000).

Filmography

Film

Television

Awards and Nominations

References

External links

 (as Charlaine Woodard)

Charlayne Woodard's Official Website
Charlayne Woodard's Acting Reel

1953 births
Living people
African-American actresses
American film actresses
American television actresses
Actors from Albany, New York
20th-century American actresses
21st-century American actresses
Actresses from New York (state)
Obie Award recipients
20th-century African-American women
21st-century African-American women
21st-century African-American people